The 2020 Argentina Open was a men's tennis tournament played on outdoor clay courts. It was the 23rd edition of the ATP Buenos Aires event, and part of the ATP Tour 250 series of the 2020 ATP Tour. It took place in Buenos Aires, Argentina, from February 10 through 16, 2020.

Singles main draw entrants

Seeds 

 1 Rankings are as of February 3, 2020.

Other entrants 
The following players received wildcards into the singles main draw:
  Francisco Cerúndolo
  Facundo Díaz Acosta 
  Leonardo Mayer

The following player received entry as a special exempt:
  Andrej Martin

The following players received entry from the qualifying draw:
  Facundo Bagnis
  Filip Horanský
  Jozef Kovalík 
  Pedro Martínez

The following players received entry as lucky losers:
  João Domingues
  Pedro Sousa

Withdrawals 
Before the tournament
  Matteo Berrettini → replaced by  Corentin Moutet
  Cristian Garín → replaced by  Pedro Sousa
  Nicolás Jarry (suspension) → replaced by  Jaume Munar
  Dominic Thiem → replaced by  Roberto Carballés Baena
  Fernando Verdasco → replaced by  João Domingues

During the tournament
  Diego Schwartzman

Doubles main draw entrants

Seeds 

 1 Rankings are as of February 3, 2020.

Other entrants 
The following pairs received wildcards into the doubles main draw:
  Andrea Collarini /  Federico Coria
  Facundo Díaz Acosta /  Carlos Taberner

The following pair received entry as alternates:
  Pablo Andújar /  Pedro Martínez

Withdrawals 
Before the tournament
  Cristian Garín

During the tournament
  Pablo Andújar
  Pablo Cuevas

Finals

Singles 

  Casper Ruud defeated  Pedro Sousa, 6–1, 6–4

Doubles 

  Marcel Granollers /  Horacio Zeballos defeated  Guillermo Durán /  Juan Ignacio Londero, 6–4, 5–7, [18–16]

References

External links 

 

Argentina Open
Argentina Open
ATP Buenos Aires
Argentina Open